Highway 678 is a highway in the Canadian province of Saskatchewan. It runs from Highway 3 to Township Road 404 near High Tor.

Highway 678 intersects Highway 23 and passes through the town of Porcupine Plain.

See also 
Roads in Saskatchewan
Transportation in Saskatchewan

References 

678